List of lakes with a dam in Switzerland with a volume of more than 10 million cubic metres (m³):

Values in bold are the extreme values (e.g., highest and lowest) of the particular column.

See also 

 List of tallest dams in Switzerland
 List of lakes of Switzerland
 List of mountain lakes of Switzerland

Switzerland

List of lakes with a dam in Switzerland
Reservoirs
Dams